Balkhar is a rural locality (a selo) and the administrative centre of Balkharsky Selsoviet, Akushinsky District, Republic of Dagestan, Russia. The population was 939 as of 2010.

Geography 
Balkhar is located 21 km west of Akusha (the district's administrative centre) by road. Kuli is the nearest rural locality.

References 

Rural localities in Akushinsky District